The Beast was a Buffalo, New York alternative biweekly print newspaper  published from 2002 until 2009 and then exclusively online until about 2013.

The Beast was founded by Matt Taibbi, Kevin McElwee, and Paul Fallon in 2002.  (Taibbi and McElwee had previously collaborated on The eXile.) It was originally a free biweekly newspaper. It's first contributing writer was Ken Barnes. 

In 2007 the publication began to charge for issues as a national monthly publication that also offered international subscriptions. In late 2009, The Beast stopped producing print editions but maintained an online presence with the tagline: "The World's Only Website." The Beast's longest-serving editor was Allan Uthman.

An annual feature of The Beast was "The 50 Most Loathsome Americans" - a list of infamous celebrities, authors, athletes, pundits, politicians, and others selected for their dubious distinction, with reasons and examples given for each entry's inclusion.

On February 23, 2011, editor Ian Murphy placed a prank telephone call to Governor Scott Walker of Wisconsin during the 2011 Wisconsin budget protests.

The Beast website closed in 2013.

References

External links
Website of the Beast
http://www.buffalonews.com/city/politics/article349786.ece
Video of Michael Moore stating that he has followed The Beast for seven years, is "impressed" by their work and hopes that their website gets many hits.

Newspapers established in 2002
Publications disestablished in 2013
Biweekly newspapers published in the United States
Newspapers published in Buffalo, New York
Alternative weekly newspapers published in the United States
Matt Taibbi